Michaël Murcy (born 18 September 1979) is a French professional football forward.

External links
Career statistics at Danmarks Radio

1979 births
Living people
People from Beaumont-sur-Oise
French footballers
French expatriate footballers
US Créteil-Lusitanos players
R.A.A. Louviéroise players
Esbjerg fB players
Clermont Foot players
FC Versailles 78 players
Shandong Taishan F.C. players
US Quevilly-Rouen Métropole players
Paris FC players
Ligue 2 players
Belgian Pro League players
Chinese Super League players
Danish Superliga players
Expatriate footballers in Belgium
Expatriate men's footballers in Denmark
Expatriate footballers in China
Expatriate footballers in Thailand
Association football forwards
Footballers from Val-d'Oise